San Román, also known as San Román Rio Hondo is a village located in the Orange Walk District in Belize. The population of the village consists mostly of Yucatec Mayan descendants. San Roman Rio Hondo is known for having a 100-year-old church.

References

Populated places in Orange Walk District